John James McGill, Sr. (November 3, 1909 – August 21, 1988) was a Canadian professional ice hockey player who played 134 games in the National Hockey League with the Montreal Canadiens between 1934 and 1937. Prior to turning professional he spent several years in the Ottawa City Hockey League and Montreal City Hockey League. He was born in Ottawa, Ontario in 1909. He died in 1988 and was buried at Hutcheson Memorial Cemetery in Huntsville, Ontario.

Career statistics

Regular season and playoffs

References

External links
 

1909 births
1988 deaths
Canadian ice hockey left wingers
Ice hockey people from Ottawa
McGill Redmen ice hockey players
Montreal Canadiens players